Ghiotto is an Italian surname. Notable people with the surname include:

Davide Ghiotto (born 1993), Italian speed skater
Luca Ghiotto (born 1995), Italian racing driver

Surnames of Italian origin
Italian-language surnames